Oaklands Junction is a bounded locality in Melbourne, Victoria, Australia,  north-west of Melbourne's Central Business District, located within the City of Hume local government area. Oaklands Junction recorded a population of 439 at the 2021 census.

Oaklands Junction is located beyond the Melbourne metropolitan Urban Growth Boundary.

History

Oaklands Junction appears to get its name from the Oaklands Hunt Club, which was established in 1888.

Oaklands Junction Post Office opened on 1 January 1865 and closed in 1971.

Oaklands Park, a housing estate located on Konagaderra Road in the north-east corner of the suburb, was constructed in 1997.

See also
 Shire of Bulla – Oaklands Junction was previously within this former local government area.

References

Towns in Victoria (Australia)
City of Hume